Events in the year 2023 in Yemen.

Incumbents 
Aden government

Sanaa government

Events 
Ongoing — COVID-19 pandemic in Yemen — The Houthi–Saudi Arabian conflict (since 2015) — The Yemeni Civil War (2014–present)

 21 January – Six people are injured after a bomb explodes in al-Majaza, Shabwah Governorate.

Deaths 
6 January – Sadiq al-Ahmar, 66, Yemeni politician and tribal leader, MP (1993–2011), cancer.

References 

 

 
Yemen
Yemen
2020s in Yemen
Years of the 21st century in Yemen